Crystal Palace (High Level) was a railway station in South London. It was one of two stations built to serve the new site of the Great Exhibition building, the Crystal Palace, when it was moved from Hyde Park to Sydenham Hill after 1851.  It was the terminus of the Crystal Palace and South London Junction Railway (CPSLJR), which was later absorbed by the London, Chatham and Dover Railway (LCDR).

History

Origins

The line, and the terminus only, opened on 1 August 1865.  It was on the southern boundary of the Hamlet of Dulwich division of the ancient Civil Parish of Camberwell St. Giles.

Features

The station was designed by Charles Barry Jr. as a lavish red brick and buff terra cotta building. It was excavated into the ridge below Crystal Palace Parade, approached from the north through the  Paxton Tunnel, requiring major engineering works.  There were subway exits leading under Crystal Palace Parade into Crystal Palace Park, linking the station directly with the palace.  The subway was a vaulted and tiled chamber resembling a Byzantine crypt; it was designed and built by cathedral craftsmen from Italy.

The building was a fine example of High Victorian architecture with high brick side- and end-walls and a glass and iron trainshed roof.  It had square towers at each corner, each topped with four short spires, and passenger concourses above the tracks at each end with booking offices, refreshment rooms and waiting rooms. One half of the station was intended for first class passengers, who were given segregated access into the central transept of the palace.

The trainshed was divided lengthways into two cavernous spaces separated by a brick-arch arcade, each side having two tracks with wooden platforms.  The inner track on each side had two platform faces to support mass arrivals.

At the exit from the tunnel the two running lines fanned out into four platform tracks, with eight sidings and a long headshunt on the right and two more sidings on the left. In addition to the usual coal depot, the sidings provided stabling for spare engines and coaching stock to handle the expected surges of traffic during big events.  The platform roads entered the north end of the trainshed via separate portals. At the south end, instead of a typical arrangement of buffers and engine release roads the four platform tracks passed through a second set of apertures to a turntable, allowing for fast turning of engines to run round their coaches.

Decline and closure
The line was one of the first of the former South Eastern and Chatham Railway to be electrified by Southern Railway, under "South Eastern Electrification – Stage 1" in July 1925.  But after the Crystal Palace was destroyed by fire in 1936, traffic on the branch declined. During World War II the line was temporarily closed after bomb damage. Although temporary repairs were made and the line subsequently reopened the decline in traffic and a requirement for heavy reconstruction work led to the decision to close the station with the branch on 20 September 1954, although it was not demolished until 1961.

Surviving structures
Although the site of the station was developed for housing in the 1970s,  the retaining walls below Crystal Palace Parade and the ornamental portal of Paxton Tunnel to the north are still readily visible. The brickwork fits exactly although the ground level is raised. The subway and an adjacent courtyard survived the 1936 fire and was used as an air raid shelter during World War II.  It is now a Grade II* listed building. Although the subway is sealed off, it is sometimes opened to allow organised visits by "Friends of Crystal Palace Subway".

Southwark Model Railway Club have built a scale model of the station.

The "train entombed in the tunnel" myth 

There is a rumour that, in one of the sealed tunnels in the area, an engine or carriage remains hidden collecting dust. Another version of the story, popular among local schoolchildren, claims that the High-Level station was closed because a commuter train was trapped by a tunnel collapse, entombing the passengers, who remain there to this day.

These stories are an example of the persistence of local urban legend. The story of the entombed train was apparently current in the 1930s. Back then it referred to the abandoned 1860s pneumatic railway on the north side of the grounds of Crystal Palace Park.

Most traces of this had almost certainly been destroyed by the building works for the 1911 Festival of Empire, but there was an unsuccessful archaeological dig for the train sponsored by the BBC's Nationwide current-affairs programme in the 1970s.

Notes

References

Further reading
Crystal Palace (High Level) and Catford Loop by V Mitchell & K Smith, Middleton Press, 1991
The Railway through Sydenham Hill Wood, From the Nun's Head to the Screaming Alice by Mathew Frith, The Friends of the Great North Wood and London Wildlife Trust leaflet 1995
London's Local Railways by A A Jackson, David & Charles, 1978
The Crystal Palace (High Level) Branch by W Smith, British Railway Journal 28, 1989

External links 
 London's Abandoned Stations – Crystal Palace branch
 Crystal Palace High Level & Upper Norwood Station at Subterranea Britannica
 Interior of the VIP entrance to the Exhibition
 Friends of Crystal Palace Subway

Crystal Palace, London
Disused railway stations in the London Borough of Southwark
Former London, Chatham and Dover Railway stations
Railway stations in Great Britain opened in 1865
Railway stations in Great Britain closed in 1917
Railway stations in Great Britain opened in 1919
Railway stations in Great Britain closed in 1944
Railway stations in Great Britain opened in 1946
Railway stations in Great Britain closed in 1954
Urban legends